WDON (1540 AM) is a radio station broadcasting on 1540 kHz in the medium wave AM band, airing Spanish-language Catholic programming known as Radio Vida en Abundancia (Life in Abundance Radio). Its transmitter is located in Wheaton, Maryland, United States, and it serves the Washington, D.C. metropolitan area. WDON has a daytime transmitter power of 5,000 watts, reaching as far north as Frederick County in Maryland and as far south as Stafford and Prince William Counties in Virginia.

History

Early history (1953–1981)
Founded by Everett L. Dillard, WDON first signed on December 4, 1953 with a daytime-only, 250-watt signal. Dillard named the call sign after his son Don, who was also a DJ at the station. Don Dillard is credited for introducing rock and roll to Washington radio and also played rhythm and blues, doo-wop, and rockabilly on his shows; he was popular among white teenagers in Northwest Washington and suburbs in neighboring Montgomery County, Maryland.

By the early 1960s, WDON shifted its format to country. Following a two-year construction permit, WDON officially increased its power to 1 kW in 1962. In the 1970s, it was an oldies station, and then briefly "Disco D-O-N". Later in the 1970s, WDON changed its format to religion.

As a Spanish-language station (1981–present)
WDON changed its call sign to WMDO on September 8, 1981. Nearly two weeks later on September 24, California-based Lotus Communications purchased WMDO. On December 14 that year, WMDO launched a full-time Spanish format branded "Radio Mundo" featuring news, public service announcements, and music targeted towards Central and South American immigrants in the Washington area. which was later co-owned by Los Cerezos Television Company with the Washington market's first Univision television station (which is now WMDO-CD).

In 1997, Alejandro Carrasco leased the station; the call letters changed to WACA. A native of the Dominican Republic, he came to the United States in the 1970s.  While attending Montgomery College in 1979, he worked as a DJ at student parties and master of ceremonies at weddings. The news staff at 1540 AM (then Radio Mundo, WMDO) discovered him at a wedding, and hired him as an anchor in 1983. Carrasco later moved to Radio Borinquen (900 AM in Laurel), rising to be general manager, and then returned to WACA to begin a 30-minute morning show,  (Heating Up the Morning), in 1987. Carrasco leased WACA and its transmitter in 1997 and then bought the station when the lease expired in 2000, naming it "Radio América".

In 2019, Carrasco purchased the 900 kHz facility and moved Radio América programming there. 1540 kHz was leased out that January and switched to Spanish-language Christian programming as Vida en Abundancia. In 2021, Renovación Media Group, headed by Father Roberto Cortés Campos, purchased the station for $700,000; the WACA call letters moved to 900 upon the consummation of the sale, and the WDON call letters returned to Wheaton for the first time in 40 years.

References

External links

DON
DON
Wheaton, Maryland
Radio stations established in 1953
1953 establishments in Maryland
DON